Ninos or Nino was an ancient Athenian woman who was executed at some point in the classical period.  Her case is known through three mentions in speeches by Demosthenes – Against Boeotus I and II, and On the False Embassy – and one in Josephus.  The prosecution was apparently brought by a man named Menecles, who would go on to be prosecuted in turn by Ninos' son.  The date of the prosecution is uncertain: Against Boeotus I was delivered in 348, which provides a terminus ante quem; Esther Eidinow suggests a date of between 362 and 358 BC.  The case was apparently well known in the mid-fourth century, as Demosthenes refers to it in his speeches as if the jury are expected to be familiar with the case.

According to Demosthenes, Ninos was a priestess, and was charged with bringing together thiasoi.  One scholiast on this passage says that her crime was mocking the Dionysian Mysteries; another says that she made love potions.  It is unclear where the scholiast's information about love potions comes from – Eidinow suggests that it is a misinterpretation of Demosthenes' text, while Matthew Dickie says that the comment "does not emerge from anything in the text of Demosthenes" and may have been derived from an Atthidographer or another speech.  Whatever its derivation, Derek Collins is skeptical of the scholiast's report, arguing that manufacturing love potions was not a criminal offence. Finally, Josephus lists Ninos as one of five Athenians put to death for asebeia (impiety).

Notes

References

Works cited
 
 
 
 
 

Ancient Athenian women
Ancient Greek priestesses
4th-century BC Greek women
4th-century BC clergy